In enzymology, a (R)-3-amino-2-methylpropionate—pyruvate transaminase is an enzyme that catalyzes the chemical reaction

(R)-3-amino-2-methylpropanoate + pyruvate  2-methyl-3-oxopropanoate + L-alanine

Thus, the two substrates of this enzyme are (R)-3-amino-2-methylpropanoate and pyruvate, whereas its two products are 2-methyl-3-oxopropanoate and L-alanine.

This enzyme belongs to the family of transferases, specifically the transaminases, which transfer nitrogenous groups.  The systematic name of this enzyme class is (R)-3-amino-2-methylpropanoate:pyruvate aminotransferase. Other names in common use include D-3-aminoisobutyrate-pyruvate transaminase, beta-aminoisobutyrate-pyruvate aminotransferase, D-3-aminoisobutyrate-pyruvate aminotransferase, D-3-aminoisobutyrate-pyruvate transaminase, (R)-3-amino-2-methylpropionate transaminase, and D-beta-aminoisobutyrate:pyruvate aminotransferase. But some additional information is that this enzyme catalyzed it transamination with L isomer, but D isomer in natural form, inactive as substrate. Also other names of enzymes similar to this contains, L-3-aminoisobutyrate transaminase, beta-aminobutyric transaminase, L-3-aminoisobutyric aminotransferase, and beta-aminoisobutyrate-alpha-ketoglutarate transaminase.

References

 
 

EC 2.6.1
Enzymes of unknown structure